The following lists events that happened during 1960 in Somalia.

Incumbents
President: Aden Abdullah Osman Daar (starting 1 July)
Prime Minister: Muhammad Haji Ibrahim Egal (1 July-12 July), Abdirashid Ali Shermarke (starting 12 July)

Events

June
 June 26 - The State of Somaliland, led by Prime Minister Muhammad Haji Ibrahim Egal, attained independence from the United Kingdom.

July
 July 1 - Italian Somaliland gained its independence from Italy, five days after British Somaliland, and merged into the Somali Republic. Aden Abdullah Othman, leader of the Italian Somaliland legislature, was elected President, and Abdirashid Ali Shermake became Prime Minister.

References

 
1960s in Somalia
Years of the 20th century in Somalia
Somalia
Somalia